The Italian general election of 1953 took place on 7 June 1953.

Christian Democracy (DC) lost some ground, but still gained a convincing 53.4% of the vote (62.2% in Vicenza, 59.9% in Treviso and 59.6% in Padua). The Italian Socialist Party (PSI) and the Italian Communist Party (PCI) ran separate lists, gaining 14.6 and 14.2% of the vote. Veneto was thus one of the few regions of Italy where the Socialists were stronger than the PCI, even without counting the PSDI (5.6%). The PSI got its best results in the provinces of Venice (21.6%), Rovigo (19.8%) and Verona (18.2%), but not in the traditional Socialist stronghold of Belluno, where it was passed by the PSDI (12.3 against 11.0%). The PCI was stronger in Rovigo (28.2%) and Venice (19.7%).

Results

Chamber of Deputies
Source: Regional Council of Veneto

Provincial breakdown
Source: Regional Council of Veneto

Senate
Source: Regional Council of Veneto

Elections in Veneto
General, Veneto